The Racket (formerly 3 Hours of Power and Full Metal Racket) is an Australian heavy metal radio show airing on alternative youth broadcaster Triple J.  The show currently airs between 9pm and 11pm on Tuesday nights and is hosted by Lochlan Watt.

The name was an allusion to the popular Kubrick war film Full Metal Jacket.

A notable, now former segment of the program is the 'Corpse Classic' - three songs played throughout the show off a pre-1987 heavy metal vinyl. Bands featured on this segment have been: Bathory, Suicidal Tendencies, Mötley Crüe, Spinal Tap, Iron Maiden among others. The 'Corpse Classic' was replaced with the similarly themed 'Heavy Metal Troopers' in 2008 because of 'running out of vinyl'. Heavy Metal Troopers involved playing songs by a band that had put out 6 or more albums, regardless of their activity. Artists to be featured included Deicide, Death and Australian figureheads Alchemist.

Other regular segments on the show were "Metal Gods" and "Living After Midnight - Priest Salute". Metal Gods (named after the song by Judas Priest and using the chorus from the song as its intro) is a trivia segment, where callers must correctly answer three questions to be crowned "Metal God". The all-time champion of Metal Gods is Chris Dare of Brisbane. Living After Midnight, also named after Judas Priest, occurs as the name suggests around midnight each week, and simply involves a Judas Priest track played. It replaced the similarly themed "2 Minutes to Midnight" (an Iron Maiden salute).

Hosts

Hosts of the show include:

Helen Razer
Francis Leach
Costa Zouliou (?-2001)
David McMillan (2001-2002)
Andrew Haug (2002-2011)
Lochlan Watt (2012-current)

Interviews

The program broadcasts pre recorded interviews by Andrew Haug with members of leading international bands. Major interviews that have aired in recent years on the show are:

Arch Enemy - Mike Amott (13/10/2006)
Blind Guardian - Hansi Kürsch (05/09/2006)
Black Label Society - Zakk Wylde (21/09/2006)
Celtic Frost - Tom G Fischer (02/07/2007)
Cannibal Corpse - Alex Webster (13/10/2006)
Dark Tranquillity - Mikael Stanne (21/09/2006 & 10/05/2007)
Fear Factory - Raymond Herrera (21/09/2006)
Killswitch Engage - Adam Dutkiewicz (24/10/2006)
Lamb of God - Randy Blythe (24/10/2006)
Megadeth - Dave Mustaine (24/10/2006)
Nevermore - Jeff Loomis (24/10/2006)
Nightwish - Tuomas Holopainen (22/03/2005)
Psycroptic - Dave Haley (28/03/2007)
Slayer - Dave Lombardo (13/10/2006) & Kerry King (24/04/2007)
Sebastian Bach - Sebastian Bach (05/09/2006)
Satyricon - Frost (13/12/2006) & Satyr (25/11/2008)
The Haunted - Anders Bjorler (24/11/2006)
Testament - Chuck Billy (13/02/2007)
Virgin Black - Rowan London (25/07/2007)
Within Temptation - Sharon Den Adel (25/05/2007)

External links 

Triple J - Full Metal Racket site
Triple J - Lochlan Watt's Profile

Triple J programs